The Secretary of State of Montana is one of the elected constitutional officers of executive branch of the U.S. state of Montana.

The current Secretary of State is Christi Jacobsen.

Organization
The Secretary of State's Office is composed of five divisions:

The Administrative Rules Services Division is the administrative law arm of the Secretary's office, filing rule notices, rule adoptions, and interpretations, and publishing the state register twice a month. The state's code of regulations, the Administrative Rules of Montana, is updated quarterly.
The Business Services Division registers business entities, trademarks, assumed business names, and liens made under the Uniform Commercial Code and Federal Food Security Act.
The Certification and Notaries Division licenses and trains notaries public and certifies documents.
The Elections and Government Services division administers elections and voter registration. Campaign finance and lobbying is regulated by a separate agency, the Commissioner of Political Practices.
The Records Management Bureau maintains the records of state and local governments.

Other duties
The Secretary is the keeper of the Montana state seal, and also serves on the Montana Board of Land Commissioners, which administers school trust lands.

The Montana Secretary of State Records Center, located in Helena, shares the duty of archiving official state e-mails with an archivist who reports to the Governor.

List of secretaries of state of Montana
To be eligible to be a Secretary of State of Montana, a candidate must be 25 years old or older, a United States citizen, and a Montana resident for at least two years before election.

See also
List of governors of Montana
List of lieutenant governors of Montana
Montana Department of Justice
List of company registers

References

External links